Bhivpuri is a town in Karjat Taluka near Mumbai. It is the location of Bhivpuri Road railway station of the Mumbai Suburban Railway. A temple of Sai Baba of Shirdi is located here. Numerous nearby waterfalls attract visitors on weekends. Bhivpuri Dam and a hydro-electricity generation plant of Tata Power is located nearby. Neral is the previous stop and Karjat is the next stop. Bhivpuri has state highway which is connecting to NH4, Panvel & Navi Mumbai and the other side connects to Badlapur & Thane District. In Bhivpuri there is one new multi facilities hospital (Raigad Hospital & Research Center) located which covers the area from Shelu, Neral to Karjat.

References

Cities and towns in Raigad district

mr:भिवपुरी